Bangladesh Itihas Samiti (also known as Bangladesh History Association) is a non-profit historical association in Bangladesh that publishes and supports research of the history of Bangladesh.

History
Bangladesh Itihas Samiti was founded in 1966. The purpose of the association is to encourage the study of the history of Bangladesh and encourage collaboration between historians. The association is based in the History Department of the Arts Faculty of the University of Dhaka. The association has published a number of books on the history of Bangladesh. It is financed by membership fees, donations and government grants.

See also
 Itihas Academy

References

Research institutes in Bangladesh
Trade associations based in Bangladesh
1966 establishments in East Pakistan
Organisations based in Dhaka
Learned societies of Bangladesh